Mark Applebaum (born 1967 in Chicago, Illinois) is an American composer and full professor of music composition and theory at Stanford University.

Biography 
Applebaum received his PhD in music composition from the University of California, San Diego where he studied with Brian Ferneyhough, Joji Yuasa, Rand Steiger, and Roger Reynolds. Prior to Stanford, he taught at UCSD, Mississippi State University, and Carleton College. 

Applebaum has received commissions from Betty Freeman, the Merce Cunningham Dance Company, the Fromm Foundation, the Kronos Quartet, the Paul Dresher Ensemble, Spoleto USA, the Vienna Modern Festival, Antwerp's Champ D'Action, Festival ADEvantgarde in Munich, Zeitgeist, Manufacture (Tokyo), the St. Lawrence String Quartet, the Jerome Foundation, and the American Composers Forum.

As a jazz pianist, Applebaum has performed around the world, including a solo recital in Ouagadougou, Burkina Faso that was sponsored by the American Embassy. In 1994, he received the jazz prize of the Southern California Jazz Society.

Music
Applebaum's solo, chamber, choral, orchestral, operatic, and electro-acoustic work has been performed through North and South America, Europe, Australia, Africa, and Asia. His music has been described as mercurial, high detailed, discipline, and exacting, but also features improvisational and whimsical aspects. His inspiration has been drawn from jazz pioneers and maverick composers such as Conlon Nancarrow and Harry Partch, who found it necessary to use or invent unusual instruments to realize their artistic visions.

In 1990, Applebaum began building unique electroacoustic instruments. One of these instruments, which Applebaum refers to as the "Mouseketier," consists of threaded rods, nails, combs, doorstops, springs, squeaky wheels, ratchets, and a toilet tank flotation bulb. His first instrument, the "Mousetrap", is used in Mousetrap Music which features a recording of sound-sculpture improvisations. The objects on the instruments are plucked, scratched, bowed, and modified by a battery of live electronics.

Many of Applebaum's compositions are composed of visual and theatrical elements. Echolalia requires the rapid execution of 22 dadaist rituals, Straitjacket includes performers drawing on amplified easels, and Aphasia requires its performer to synchronize choreographed hand gestures to tape.

Selected works

Orchestral music
Dead White Males
Skumfiduser!
Martian Anthropology 1.2.3
Sock Monkey
Concerto for Florist and Orchestra

Choral music and opera
Triple Concerto
Martian Anthropology 4.5.6

Works for symphonic wind ensemble and jazz orchestra
Ambitus
Agitprop

Chamber music
Sum = Parts for chamber orchestra
56 1/2 ft. for chamber orchestra
Integrity for two percussion and piano
Depth for trombone and contrabass
Merit for wind quintet
Seriousness for string trio
Janus for ten players
Nepotism for percussion and strings
Catfish for percussion trio
Scipio Wakes Up for sextet
Martian Anthropology 7.8.9 for sextet
Asylum for ten players
The Blue Cloak for soloist and sextet
Magnetic North for soloist and brass quintet
Identity Destruction Sport for septet
Accretion/Deletion for quintet
48 Objects for sixteen players
Sixteen for sixteen players
Mobile for Paper for any number of players
The Composer's Middle Period for sextet
Theme in Search of Variations I for percussion trio
Theme in Search of Variations II for quintet
Theme in Search of Variations III for quartet
Straitjacket for percussion quintet
Coat Room for octet
Rabbit Hole for octet
30 for twelve percussionists
The First Decade for percussion
The Second Decade for percussion quartet
The Third Decade for percussion septet
Clicktrack for twelve percussionists
Speed Dating for octet
Control Freak for singer and septet
Medium for quartet
column facing on 3 behind lintel for quartet
Mt. Moriah for string quartet
20 for string quartet
Darmstadt Kindergarten for string quartet
1:00 for string quartet
Hymn for saxophone quartet
Tlön for three conductors
Meditation for piano six hands
7 one-minute canons for flute, vibraphone, and cello
Jetsam for piano trio
Landscape for piano trio
Go, Dog. Go! for percussion duo
Gone, Dog. Gone! for percussion duo
Ferneyhough ReMix for percussion duo
On the Nature of the Modern Age for piano duo
Unholy & Surreal for two pianos
Speed Date for violin and cello
Curb Weight Surgical Field duo for grand piano and two players
Neo-Tribes for alto saxophone
The Plate of Transition Nourishes the Chameleon Appetite for violin
Anesthesia (+83) for viola
Sargasso (83+) for cello
Narcissus: Strata/Panacea for marimba
Authenticity for trumpet
Entre Funérailles I for trumpet
Entre Funérailles II for vibraphone
Entre Funérailles IV for flute
Cadenza for piano
Disciplines for piano
Penumbra for piano
Omnibus Etude for piano
Elegy for carillon or piano
DNA for guitar
Pause for piano
Aphasia for hand gestures and tape
Composition Machine #1 for percussion
Echolalia for amplified Dadaist rituals
Zero-One for mousetrap sound-sculpture
Skeletons in the Closet for 8-channel sound
Wristwatch: Geology, Wristwatch: Alien Argot, Wristwatch: Meridian, Wristwatch: Rabbit Hole, Wristwatch: Speed Dating, Wristwatch: Control Freak for variable players

Tape music
Pre-Composition
The Janus ReMixes
Snagglepuss ReMix
Variations on Variations on a Theme by Mozart

Improvisation works
The Metaphysics of Notation
The Bible Without God
S-tog
Concerto for Florist and Ensemble
Plundergraphic
5:3
Intellectual Property
40 Cryptograms

Discography

1989 Your Parents Hate Me, Aphasia Records
1996 Mousetrap Music, Innova 
1999 The Janus ReMixes, Innova 
1999 Sonic Circuits VII, Innova 
2002 The Apple Doesn't Fall Far from the Tree, Innova 
2003 Cornucopia, Capstone 
2003 Mark Applebaum: Intellectual Property, Innova 
2003 Catfish, Tzadik 
2004 Oni Buchanan: Solo Piano, Velvet Ear Records 
2004 Martian Anthropology, Innova 
2004 Disciplines, Innova 
2005 56 1/2 ft., Innova 
2005 The Bible Without God, Innova 
2006 Asylum, Innova 
2006, [re], Everglade 
2008 Sock Monkey, Innova 
2008 Escapement, Everglade 
2010 The Metaphysics of Notation, Innova 
2015 30, Innova 
2019 Asylum, Innova

References

External links
 Mark Applebaum's Website
 Mark Applebaum on Vimeo
 Stanford Magazine "Heard This One?"
 Atlantic Center for the Arts Residency #134
 Progress Report: The State of the Art after Sixteen Years of Designing and Playing Electroacoustic Sound-Sculptures
 James Bash. "Applebaum, Mark." Grove Music Online. Oxford Music Online. Oxford University Press, accessed October 13, 2014
 

Living people
20th-century classical composers
American male classical composers
American classical composers
21st-century classical composers
University of California, San Diego alumni
1967 births
Musicians from Chicago
Pupils of Brian Ferneyhough
21st-century American composers
20th-century American composers
Classical musicians from Illinois
20th-century American male musicians
21st-century American male musicians